Behind The Player: Duff McKagan is an Interactive Music Video featuring Guns N' Roses and Velvet Revolver bassist Duff McKagan
. Released on November 1, 2008 by IMV, the DVD features McKagan giving in-depth bass lessons for how to play "Slither" and "Set Me Free" by Velvet Revolver and an intimate behind-the scenes look at his life as a professional musician, including rare photos and video.  The DVD also includes McKagan jamming the two tracks with Jane's Addiction drummer Stephen Perkins, VideoTab that shows exactly how McKagan plays his parts in the two songs, as well as other bonus material.

IMV donates $.25 from the sale of each Behind the Player DVD to Little Kids Rock, an organization that gets instruments in the hands of underprivileged kids.

Contents
Behind The Player
McKagan talks about his background, influences and gear, including rare photos and video

"Slither" by Velvet Revolver
Lesson: Duff gives an in-depth bass lesson for how to play the song
Jam: McKagan jams the track with Jane's Addiction drummer Stephen Perkins
VideoTab: Animated tablature shows exactly how McKagan plays the track

"Set Me Free" by Velvet Revolver
Lesson: McKagan gives an in-depth bass lesson for how to play the song
Jam: McKagan jams the track with Jane's Addiction drummer Stephen Perkins
VideoTab: Animated tablature shows exactly how McKagan plays the track

Special features
Video Clip of McKagan playing drums live with Guns N' Roses drummer Matt Sorum
Photo Album
Little Kids Rock promotional video

Personnel

Produced By: Ken Mayer & Sean E Demott
Directed By: Dean Karr
Producer: Leon Melas
Executive Producer: Rick Donaleshen
Director Of Photography: Paulo Cascio
Sound Engineer: Matt Chidgey
Edited By: Jeff Morose
Mixed By: Matt Chidgey & Cedrick Courtois
Graphics By: Thayer DeMay
Transcription By: Thayer DeMay
Camera Operators: Brian Silva, Joe Hendrick, Doug Cragoe, Nate Lipp
Technical Directors: Tyler Bourns & Chris Golde

Gaffer: John Parker
Assistant Director: Matt Pick
Lighting And Grip: Mcnulty Nielson
Key Grip: Jaletta Kalman
Artist Hospitality: Sasha Mayer
Shot At: Third Encore
Special Guest: Stephen Perkins
Cover Photo By: Dean Karr
Video Courtesy Of: Robert John, Dean Karr, Henry Rollins, Joe Lester
Photos Courtesy Of: Dean Karr, Robert John, Marty Temme, Adina L. Hilling, Angelika Brueschke, Anja Baarslag, Tracy Ketcher, Bev Davies, Mary Beth Mohnach, Amanda Perry
Photo Library Complements Of: Ultimaterockpix.Com

References

External links
Official website

Behind the Player
Duff McKagan